Al-Musheirifa (or ) is an Arab village in Israel's Haifa District. Since 1996, it has been under the jurisdiction of the Ma'ale Iron local council. In mid-2016 Musheirifa's population was 3472, all of whom are Muslim. The village is divided into four neighborhoods: Ighbarieh, El-Manshya, Jabbarin, and the Old Village. The inhabitants are largely members of the Ighbarieh clan, which inhabits the upper parts of the village, and the Jabbarin clan, which inhabit the lower parts. Bayada was a neighborhood of the village in the past but split from it and became a new village. The village has poor infrastructure and, like many other villages in the Wadi Ara region, lacks many social institutions and recreational areas.

History

Ottoman and British Mandate periods
According to local tradition, Musheirifa was established in 1880 by people from nearby Umm al-Fahm. In the Palestine Exploration Fund's 1882 Survey of Western Palestine, Musheirifa was described as a "very small hamlet on high ground, with a well to the south".

In the 1922 census conducted by the British Mandate authorities, the population of the village was 203, all of whom were Muslim, increasing in the  1931 census to 233, still all Muslim, living in 45 houses. 

In the 1945 statistics, Musheirifa's population was counted (together with other villages) under Umm al-Fahm.

1948 war
During the 1948 Arab-Israeli War the village and the surrounding area came under Iraqi control. On 15 April 1948, Jewish forces raided the village and did not capture it. In March 1949 Jordanian forces replaced the Iraqi forces in Wadi Ara. On 3 April 1949 Israel and Jordan signed an armistice agreement in which Israel would receive the Wadi Ara area.

State of Israel

Musheirifa is one of the villages of Wadi Ara that lacked municipal status after the establishment of Israel. It was under the administration of mukhtars (village headmen) who were appointed by the Interior Ministry until 1992, when the Interior Ministry established the Nahal Iron regional council. The locals objected to the administrative arrangement, and sought independent municipal status for each village. To allay local concerns, the Interior Ministry established an investigative committee to examine other options, and in 1996, decided to split the regional council into two local councils: Ma'ale Iron, which includes Musheirifa, and Basma.

*In the 2008 census Musheirifa's population was counted with Bayada and together their population was 3,100.

Geography
The village is located on a group of hills overlooking the Jezreel Valley, which gives it its name "The High Places". The Ba'ana river flows through the village. In the middle of the village there is a spring which used to provide water to the residents until it dried in recent years. It was used for irrigation and as a recreational site for the residents. Today the spring still flows but the amount of water decreased. Around the spring there are mint plants.

See also
Arab localities in Israel

References

Bibliography

External links
 Welcome To Musheirifa
Survey of Western Palestine, Map 8:    IAA, Wikimedia commons 

Arab localities in Israel
Triangle (Israel)
Wadi Ara